"The Miracle of Life" is a documentary film about the human reproductive process. The film won multiple awards including a Peabody and an Emmy when it was broadcast as part of the American TV series Nova. Photographed by Lennart Nilsson, the program originally aired in Sweden on November 25, 1982 under the title of "The Saga of Life." The BBC acquired the episode for the documentary series Horizon and aired it that same month. Many scenes were edited and the intro in both the Horizon and Nova versions are different, as well as the ending scene where the baby was born.

The Nova version of the film was broadcast on PBS on February 15, 1983. It was written and produced by Bebe Nixon and narrated by Anita Sangiolo.

A sequel called "Life's Greatest Miracle" aired on November 20, 2001 on PBS using microimagery taken by Lennart Nilsson with narration by John Lithgow.

Awards
The episode won the following awards:

1984
 American Film Festival Blue Ribbon
 American Film Festival Emily Award
 Ohio State Award
 San Francisco International Film Festival Award

1983
 Emmy Award
George Foster Peabody Award

References

External links
 Life's Greatest Miracle Video on PBS

2010s American documentary television series
American educational television series
English-language television shows
Peabody Award-winning broadcasts
Science education television series
PBS original programming